Carex breweri, known as Brewer's sedge, is a species of sedge that grows on dry rocky or gravel slopes in the Sierra Nevada and Cascade Mountains of the western United States, as far north as Mount Hood. It is classified in Carex sect. Inflatae, alongside Carex engelmannii and Carex subnigricans.

References

breweri
Flora of Washington (state)
Flora of Oregon
Flora of California
Flora of Nevada
Plants described in 1867
Flora without expected TNC conservation status